Penicillium dierckxii is a species of the genus of Penicillium which produces citreoviridin and citrinin.

See also
 List of Penicillium species

References 

dierckxii
Fungi described in 1923